Steinsdalsfossen (also called Øvsthusfossen or Øfsthusfossen) is a waterfall in the village of Steine in the municipality of Kvam in Vestland county, Norway.

The waterfall is one of the most visited tourist sites in Norway. From the parking lot, the path goes along the waterfall, up a hill, and behind it where visitors can walk dryshod "into" the rumbling water.

History
The waterfall was formed in 1699 when the river found a new race.

The Emperor Wilhelm II of Germany visited Steinsdalsfossen every summer (apart from two years) from 1889 until the start of World War I in 1914.

See also
Waterfalls of Norway

References

External links

A visit to Steinsdalsfossen

Kvam
Waterfalls of Vestland
1699 in Norway